IVL may refer to:

 The IATA code for Ivalo Airport
 Involucrin, a human gene
 Ilmailuvoimien Lentokonetehdas, a Finnish defense, aviation and aerospace company
 Indian Volley League, a professional volleyball league in India
 Julius (nomen), Roman gens